ACRCloud (Formerly Syntec TV) is an automatic content recognition platform based on acoustic fingerprinting technology.  Its creator intended to help media, broadcasters and app developers to identify, monitor and monetize content on the second screen.

ACRCloud allows users to upload their own content and ingest live feeds for audio identification and broadcast monitoring. Beyond that, ACRCloud has indexed over 68m tracks in its music fingerprinting database. ACRCloud launch a worldwide radio station database with over 30k radio stations in July 2018, it enables the clients to monitor music and their custom content on the radio station without collecting the stream URLs of the stations.

Features 

The major service from ACRCloud are music recognition, content monitoring, live and pre-taped content identification and triggering, it also offers broadcast monitoring, audio measurement, copyright compliance solutions.  For developers, ACRCloud supports Android, iOS, Java, Python, Node.js SDKs and SDKs for other programming languages.

Clients 
Clients include:

Music Recognition & Humming Recognition: Anghami, Xiaomi, Musixmatch, Huawei Music, Genius (company) mobile app and
Deezer. And with other Company Alibaba, Cartoon Network, Baidu and DTS.

See also 
 Automatic content recognition
 List of music software

References 

Chinese music websites
Music search engines
Online music and lyrics databases